The Ibar, also known as the  Ibër and Ibri, is a river that flows through eastern Montenegro, northern Kosovo and central Serbia, with a total length of . The river begins in the Hajla mountain, in Rožaje, eastern Montenegro, and passes through southwestern Serbia and northern Kosovo, where it leads back into Serbia to flow into the West Morava river near Kraljevo, central Serbia.

It belongs to the Black Sea drainage basin. It is not navigable.

Etymology 
The scholar Ejup Mushoviq theorized that the word derives from the Albanian i Bardhë, meaning "white". Professor Niko Zupančić has theorized that the word Ibar is related to the Basque word for "river" (i-ba/r/i), which is also how the Ebro river in Spain received its name. Other scholars have suggested that the name is derived from Greek, given that the river's ancient name was Hiberus.

Upper course 
The Ibar originates from six springs on the Hajla mountain in eastern Montenegro. It generally flows north-east, passing through Ibarac, Rožaje, Radetina and Bać, after which it enters Serbia. Passing through the most southern part of Raška District, it flows through several small villages. In this whole area, the river has no major tributaries, but many short streams which flow into it from surrounding mountains. This part also represents the route of one of two main roads connecting Serbia and Montenegro (Ibarska magistrala).

Middle course 
Continuing south, the river enters Kosovo and passes through Gazivode, Zubin Potok, Ugljare, Zupče and Šipolje, reaching the city of Mitrovica. There, it makes a sharp, elbow turn to the north, flowing through Zvečan, Slatina, Sočanica, Leposavić, Dren and Lešak, entering central Serbia at the village of Donje Jarinje.

In Kosovo 
At Kosovo, the river is dammed, creating the artificial Lake Gazivoda (area , altitude , depth ). Water from the lake is used for industrial and mining facilities in the Mitrovica/Trepča area. Below Gazivoda another reservoir is created, Lake Pridvorice. These lakes allow irrigation of an area of 300 km2, representing part of a plan, never completed, of a huge Ibar-Lepenac Hydrosystem, which was supposed to regulate the Ibar-Sitnica-Lepenac watercourse (including ecological protection, irrigation and power production).

At Mitrovica, the river enters a minerals and ore-rich area of the western slopes of Kopaonik mountain, which it follows for the next  or so. The area is especially rich in lead, zinc and silver (Stari Trg, Trepča and Leposavić mines).

Right on its elbow turn, the Ibar receives its longest (right) tributary, the Sitnica.

In Serbia 
Entering central Serbia again, the river receives its major tributaries: the Raška, Studenica and Lopatnica, from the left, and the Jošanica.

This stretch of the river is famous for its pinched meanders and gigantic whirlpools.

 Dolina istorije (Serbian: Долина историје; Valley of history), consisting of ruins of the medieval city of Maglič, the monastery of Studenica, the monastery of Žiča, the monastery of Gradac, etc.;
 Dolina jorgovana (Serbian: Долина јоргована; Valley of the lilacs);
 Dolina banja (Serbian: Долина бања; Valley of the spas), with many spas and springs, such as Jošanička Banja, Mataruška Banja and Bogutovačka Banja.

The gorge is carved between the mountains of Golija, Čemerno and Troglav from the east, and Kopaonik, Željin and Stolovi from the west.

This is a continuation of Kopaonik's mining-rich area, including deposits of iron ore (Kopaonik, Raška), nickel (Kopaonik), asbestos (Brvenik), magnesite (Bela Stena) and hard coal (Baljevac, Ušće and Jarando).

The Ibar has previously gained notoriety as being the most polluted river in Serbia (together with its major tributary, the Sitnica), especially from frequent spills of extremely poisonous phenol, which causes constant problems for the population of Kraljevo, since the city uses the river's water for public waterworks.

Electricity 

In 2009, governments of Serbia and Italy signed an agreement which included construction of the "Ibar hydropower plants" complex, with ten hydroelectric power plants on Ibar. A detailed project was drafted, all studies were conducted, a joint Serbian-Italian company for construction of the facilities was formed, and the parliament ratified the agreement. After the 2011 Italian government change, Italy also changed its abroad investment policies and effectively quit the agreement. Power plants were to be built between the village of Bojanići and locality of Lakat, near Mataruška Banja. The entire section is administratively part of the City of Kraljevo. Therefore, no settlements will be relocated as the flooding of the valley would be minimal. The existing road would have to be relocated at four locations. 

The planned dams were Bojanići, Gokčanica, Ušće, Glavica, Cerje, Gradina, Bela Glava, Dobre Strane, Maglič, and Lakat, with the total capacity of 450 GW-h. All dams would have fish ladders and kayaking paths. Studies envisioned tourism development with ten small, cascade reservoirs, but also concluded that the stable water levels woul prevent floods and benefit the fish spawning, including species presently not inhabiting Ibar, like carp or zander, which could be introduced. Architect Milan Lojanica was hired to design the dams. He designed them in the spirit of the Serbian medieval architecture and the Nemanjić period. Ratification of the agreement expired in 2021, but some experts publicly revived the idea in January 2023, as the project is generally not considered complicated and expensive.

See also 
 List of rivers of Europe
 Rivers of Serbia
 Rivers of Montenegro
 List of rivers of Kosovo

References 

 Mala Prosvetina Enciklopedija, Third edition (1985); Prosveta; 
 Jovan Đ. Marković (1990): Enciklopedijski geografski leksikon Jugoslavije Svjetlost-Sarajevo; 

 
Rivers of Serbia
Rivers of Montenegro
Rivers of Kosovo
International rivers of Europe